Project Z may refer to: 

 Project Z (bomber project), a Japanese project of World War II
 Project Z (band), a band for which Jimmy Herring played
 Project Z, a development of the original Nissan Z-car
 Project Z (film), a Telugu-language version of the film Maayavan

See also
 Z Plan (disambiguation)
 Plan Z, the planned expansion of the German navy ordered by Adolf Hitler